Lilo Danielle Pozzo is an American chemical engineer who is a Professor of Chemical Engineering at the University of Washington. Her research considers the development, measurement and control of molecular self-assembly. She is interested in the realization of materials for energy storage and conversion. Pozzo serves on the editorial board of the Royal Society of Chemistry journal Digital Discovery.

Early life and education 
Pozzo was born in Argentina and raised in Puerto Rico. She was an undergraduate student at the University of Puerto Rico at Mayagüez where she studied chemical engineering, earning her bachelor's degree in 2001. After graduating she joined Carnegie Mellon University, where she studied Triblock copolymers as thermoreversible micellar templates for three-dimensional arrays under the supervision of Lynn M. Walker. Pozzo joined National Institute of Standards and Technology as a postdoctoral fellow.

Research and career 
Pozzo's research considers polymers and colloidal systems and the application of advanced characterization techniques to understand their structure-property relationships. She has applied these materials to medical imaging contrast agents and energy storage technologies. Pozzo's research page can be found here.

In 2017, Pozzo and her research team launched a project in Jayuya, Puerto Rico, seeking to evaluate how extended power outages impacted the health of rural patients. In the wake of Hurricane Maria, Pozzo raised funding from people in Seattle to build renewable energy infrastructure in Puerto Rico. As part of these efforts, she installed several solar nanogrid arrays (small scale systems that can produce, store and distribute electricity) to power refrigerators.

Pozzo has also worked on data-driven materials design and high-throughput experimentation. She focuses on ways to adapt hardware and software to design new materials for clean energy and healthcare.

In 2018, Pozzo was awarded the United States Department of Energy Clean Energy, Education and Empowerment (C3E) initiative education award. The award recognizes efforts of advocates in driving uptake of clean energy technologies in society. Later that year she was honored at the Latinx Faculty Recognition Event.

In 2021-2023 Pozzo was named and served as interim chair of the Materials Science department at the University of Washington.

Selected publications

Awards 

 Anne Mayes Neutron Scattering Award, 2022
 DOE Women in Clean Energy C3E Education Award, 2018
 UW College of Engineering Distinguished Teaching Award, 2018
 UW LatinX Faculty Recognition Award, 2017
 Department of Energy Early Career Award, 2013
 University of Washington Outstanding Undergraduate Research Mentor Award, 2013

References 

Living people
Carnegie Mellon University alumni
American chemical engineers
University of Washington faculty
21st-century American scientists
University of Puerto Rico at Mayagüez people
21st-century American women scientists
Year of birth missing (living people)